Fergerson is a surname. People with the surname include:

Cecil Fergerson (1931–2013), African-American art curator and community activist
Duke Fergerson (born 1954), American football player
Mable Fergerson (born 1955), American athlete

Surnames of English origin